Saint Jerome in the Wilderness is an unfinished painting by the Italian Renaissance artist Leonardo da Vinci, dated . The composition of the painting has been drafted in monochrome onto the primed wooden panel. At an unknown date after Leonardo's death, the panel was cut into five pieces before eventually being restored into its original form (minus a very small triangle). Created during Leonardo's last years in Florence, or his first years in Milan, the work is now in the Vatican Museums.

Description
The oil draft of an unfinished painting depicts Saint Jerome in advanced age during his retreat to the Syrian desert, where he lived the life of a hermit. The saint kneels in a rocky landscape, gazing toward a crucifix which can be discerned faintly sketched in at the extreme right of the painting. In Jerome's right hand he holds a rock with which he is traditionally shown beating his chest in penance. At his feet is the lion which became a loyal companion after he extracted a thorn from its paw. The lion, the stone and a cardinal's hat are the traditional attributes of the saint.

On the left-hand side of the panel the background is a distant landscape of a lake surrounded by precipitous mountains shrouded in mist. To the right-hand side, the only discernible feature is a faintly-sketched church, seen through the opening in the rocks. The church's presence may allude to Jerome's position in Western Christianity as one of the Doctors of the Church.

The composition of the painting is innovative for the oblique trapezoid form of the figure of the saint. The angular forms contrast with the sinuous form of the lion which transcribes an "S" across the bottom of the painting. The lion is also a symbol of power and strength associated with the Gospel of Mark which Jerome translated into Latin. The form of Saint Jerome prefigures that of the Virgin Mary in the Virgin of the Rocks. The rendering of the muscles in the neck and shoulders is seen as the first of Leonardo's anatomical drawings.

Interpretation

Penitence is one of the themes central to religious iconography. Jerome, who is primarily famous for his translation of the Bible into Latin, the so-called Vulgate, in old age retreated to the wilderness as a penitent. Here, as in any other paintings of this subject, he meditates on the crucified Christ. Beyond the crucifix may be seen the faint image of a church, probably representing a vision of the New Jerusalem, the heavenly afterlife to which Jerome aspires.

It has been speculated by George Bent that Leonardo's choice of subject matter here might relate directly to Leonardo's own spiritual life, most particularly to an accusation in 1476 of his involvement in homosexual activities with a male prostitute, Jacopo Saltarelli. Charges were brought on four young men because of an anonymous accusation. Homosexual activity was illegal in Florence. They were not convicted. According to Bent, Leonardo may be seen as experiencing remorse either for his ordeal or his transgression which allowed him to identify more closely with the suffering depicted in the Saint Jerome oil sketch.

Provenance
The panel has been reduced in size and the remaining part was cut into five parts at some point in its history and was reassembled for the early 19th-century collector, Cardinal Fesch, the uncle of Napoleon Bonaparte. Popular legend has it that the cardinal discovered the part of the panel with the saint's torso being offered as a table top or box lid in a shop in Rome. Five years later, he found another piece being used as a wedge for shoemaker's bench. Whatever the circumstances of Fesch's finding the parts, the repaired panel was sold by his descendants to Pope Pius IX, who installed it in the Pinacoteca Vaticana, now part of the Vatican Museums. The Saint Jerome was once believed to have been part of the collection of the painter Angelica Kauffman, but this theory too has been rejected by recent scholars.

Exhibitions
Although normally on display at the Vatican Museums, Saint Jerome was loaned to the Metropolitan Museum of Art in New York during the summer of 2019 in the Robert Lehman Wing, from July 15 to the start of October. The display was a dedicated stand-alone presentation of the painting under subdued lighting for preservation purposes.

Notes

References

Sources

External links
 

Lions in art
Paintings by Leonardo da Vinci
Leonardo
Paintings in the collection of the Vatican Museums
Churches in art
Unfinished paintings